Avon R. Honey (May 1, 1947 – February 12, 2010) was a Democratic member of the Louisiana House of Representatives for the 63rd District since his victory in a special election held in March 2002 until his death in office.

Honey was elected to succeed Kip Holden, who was elected to the Louisiana State Senate and later as Mayor-President of Baton Rouge.

References

External links
 Louisiana House of Representatives - Avon Honey official government website
 Project Vote Smart - Representative Avon R. Honey (LA) profile
 Follow the Money - Avon Honey
 2005 2003 campaign contributions

1947 births
2010 deaths
Democratic Party members of the Louisiana House of Representatives
Politicians from Baton Rouge, Louisiana
African-American state legislators in Louisiana
Activists for African-American civil rights
Methodists from Louisiana